Prince Wolfgang of Hesse-Kassel (or Hesse-Cassel) (Wolfgang Moritz; 6 November 1896 – 12 July 1989) was the designated Hereditary Prince of the monarchy of Finland (with the irredentist pretension to Estonia), and as such, already called the Crown Prince of Finland officially until 14 December 1918, and also afterwards by some monarchists.

Wolfgang was born at Castle Rumpenheim, Offenbach am Main. He was the second-born of a pair of twins, the fourth child and son born to Prince Frederick Charles of Hesse (1868–1940) and Princess Margaret of Prussia (1872–1954). His maternal uncle was the German Emperor William II. Wolfgang's father Frederick Charles of Hesse was elected King of Finland on 9 October 1918, to replace his first cousin once removed, the deposed Russian emperor, Nicholas II, who was titled Grand Duke of Finland. However, Frederick Charles renounced the throne on 14 December 1918, and the title was never actually held by the family.

Wolfgang would have been his father's heir as King of Finland instead of his elder twin Prince Philipp of Hesse (1896–1980), who was the next heir of the rights over the defunct Electorate of Hesse, but apparently because Wolfgang was with his parents in 1918 and ready to travel to Finland (where a wedding to a Finnish lady was reportedly being prepared for the coming Crown Prince). Philipp was on active service and incommunicado at the time.

Wolfgang married on 17 September 1924 Princess Marie Alexandra of Baden (1902–1944), daughter of Prince Maximilian of Baden and Princess Marie Louise of Hanover; they had no children. 

Wolfgang adopted his nephew, Prince Karl Adolf of Hesse (born 1937), elder son of his younger brother Christoph who was killed in action in 1943.

At the time of his death in Frankfurt at the age of 92, Wolfgang was the last surviving descendant of Queen Victoria of the United Kingdom who had been born in her lifetime. Victoria died in 1901 when Wolfgang was four years old.

He married secondly Ottilie Moeller (1903-1991), the daughter of Ludwig Moeller and Eleanore Steinmann, in September 1948.

Ancestry

References

 Sjöström (2013) "Suomen kuningas" kuoli. Suomen Kuvalehti 22/2013 page 17.

External links
 Article about the House of Hesse and the throne of Finland Helsingin Sanomat 

 

 

1896 births
1989 deaths
Finnish royalty
House of Hesse-Kassel
German twins
Recipients of the Order of the Cross of Liberty, 3rd Class
Princes of Hesse
Taunus